2061 Anza, provisional designation , is an eccentric asteroid of the Amor group, a subtype of near-Earth objects, estimated to measure approximately 2.7 kilometers in diameter. It was discovered on 22 October 1960, by American astronomer Henry Giclas at Lowell's Flagstaff Observatory in Arizona, United States. The asteroid was later named after Spanish explorer Juan Bautista de Anza.

Classification and orbit 

Anza is an Amor asteroid – a subgroup of near-Earth asteroids that approach the orbit of Earth from beyond, but do not cross it. Orbiting the Sun at a distance of 1.1–3.5 AU once every 3 years and 5 months (1,247 days), its orbit has an eccentricity of 0.54 and an inclination of 4° with respect to the ecliptic. Due to its high eccentricity, Anza also classifies as a Mars-crosser. The body's observation arc begins with its official discovery observation.

Close approaches 

It was not observed again until its next near-Earth approach of 1977.

Physical characteristics 

In the Tholen classification, Anza has a rare TCG: spectral type.

Lightcurves 

In the 1960s, a rotational lightcurve of Anza was obtained from photometric observations taken at the discovering observatory by Austrian astronomer Karl Rakos from Graz University Observatory. Lightcurve analysis gave a rotation period of 11.50 hours with a brightness amplitude of 0.3 magnitude. No additional lightcurves have been obtained since.

Diameter and albedo 

According to Tom Gehrels publication in his book Hazards Due to Comets and Asteroids, Anza measures 2.6 kilometers in diameter, while the Collaborative Asteroid Lightcurve Link assumes a standard albedo for carbonaceous asteroids of 0.057 and calculates a diameter of 2.71 kilometers based on an absolute magnitude of 16.56.

Naming 

This minor planet was named after Juan Bautista de Anza (1736–1788), Spanish explorer and Governor of Santa Fe de Nuevo México for the Spanish Empire in the 18th century, now the U.S state of New Mexico. He was born in Tucson, Arizona, then New Spain, and became the commander at the Spanish fortification Presidio San Ignacio de Tubac before he explored the first overland route from southern Arizona to California (Monterey).

The official  was published by the Minor Planet Center on 1 August 1978.

References

External links 
 Hazards due to Comets and Asteroids (1994)
 Asteroid Lightcurve Database (LCDB), query form (info )
 Dictionary of Minor Planet Names, Google books
 Asteroids and comets rotation curves, CdR – Observatoire de Genève, Raoul Behrend
 
 
 

002061
Discoveries by Henry L. Giclas
002061
Named minor planets
002061
19601022